The men's 400 metres hurdles event at the 1951 Pan American Games was held at the Estadio Monumental in Buenos Aires on 27 and 28 February.

Medalists

Results

Heats

Final

References

Athletics at the 1951 Pan American Games
1951